Denílson Custódio Machado (born 28 March 1943), best known as Denílson, is a Brazilian former footballer who played as a midfielder.

He played entire career (1962–1974) at Fluminense, and won  four Rio de Janeiro State Championship (1964, 1969, 1971, 1973), and three Guanabara Rio Cup (1966, 1969, 1971).

At international level, he made 9 appearances for the Brazil national football team, scoring 1 goal, and participated at the 1966 FIFA World Cup, making two appearances against Bulgaria and Portugal.

He is known as the 'king of step-overs'.

Honours 
Fluminense
 Campeonato Brasileiro Série A: 1970
 Campeonato Carioca: 1964, 1969, 1971, 1973

References

People from Campos dos Goytacazes
1943 births
Living people
Brazilian footballers
Brazilian football managers
Association football midfielders
Brazil international footballers
1966 FIFA World Cup players
Madureira Esporte Clube players
Fluminense FC players
Atlético Rio Negro Clube players
Esporte Clube Vitória players
Esporte Clube Vitória managers
Goytacaz Futebol Clube managers
Sportspeople from Rio de Janeiro (state)